Friedrich von Oppeln-Bronikowski (7 April 1873 – 9 October 1936) was a German writer, translator, publisher and cultural historian. His grave is located in the Südwestkirchhof Stahnsdorf near Berlin.

Life 
Friedrich von Oppeln-Bronikowski was born into a traditionalist family of military officers in Kassel. He began a similarly ambitious military career himself, attending a cadet academy then joining a Hussar regiment. However, a serious riding accident brought his military career to a sudden end.

Studies and writing career 
Oppeln-Bronikowski turned his attention to a civilian education, studying philosophy and archaeology in Berlin. Afterwards he lived as an independent author first in Italy then in Switzerland. In 1905 he returned to Berlin and published numerous novels, novellas, and short stories. Military life and Prussian history were frequent subjects of his works and appealed to the interests of his contemporaries. He also wrote biographical compositions and essays on cultural history.

Translations 
Oppeln-Bronikowski translated a great deal of French and Belgian literature, including the works of Maurice Maeterlinck. Notably, he also translated Niccolò Machiavelli's The Prince from Italian. With the beginning of the First World War in 1914, Oppeln-Bronikowski was summoned for military service and served with the General Staff. From 1920 to 1923 he was active in the foreign ministry.

Writings against Antisemitism 
In his later works Oppeln-Bronikowski opposed the growing antisemitism in Germany. He advocated equitable treatment of Jews with Antisemitismus? Eine unparteiische Prüfung ("Antisemitism? An objective examination") in 1920 and Gerechtigkeit! Zur Lösung der Judenfrage ("Justice! Resolving the Jewish question") in 1932.

Selected works 
 Aus dem Sattel geplaudert und Anderes, 1898
 Der Rebell, 1908
 Antisemitismus ? Eine unparteiische Prüfung, 1920
 Gerechtigkeit! Zur Lösung der Judenfrage, 1932
 Der große König als erster Diener seines Staates, 1934
 Der alte Dessauer, 1936
 Der Exot, 2012 (Manuscript 1929)

References 
 Adolf Bartels: Die Berechtigung des Antisemitismus. Eine Widerlegung der Schrift von Herrn von Oppeln-Bronikowsky "Antisemitismus?". Weicher, Leipzig 1921
 Walther Killy, etc. (editor): Deutsche Biographische Enzyklopädie. K.G. Saur Munich, 1998, . 

Specific

External links 
 
 

1873 births
1936 deaths
19th-century German translators
20th-century German translators
19th-century German historians
20th-century German historians
19th-century biographers
20th-century biographers
19th-century publishers (people)
20th-century publishers (people)
Activists against antisemitism
German biographers
Male biographers
German publishers (people)
German untitled nobility
Writers from Kassel
19th-century German male writers
20th-century German male writers